The 358th Bombardment Squadron is an inactive United States Air Force unit.  It was last assigned to the 303d Bombardment Wing at Davis–Monthan Air Force Base, Arizona, where it was inactivated on 15 June 1964.

History

World War II

The 358th Bombardment Squadron was established in February 1942 as a Boeing B-17 Flying Fortress heavy bomber squadron at Pendleton Field, Oregon and assigned to the 303d Bombardment Group. It moved to Gowen Field, Idaho, where it trained under Second Air Force. The squadron deployed to Southern California to fly antisubmarine patrols over the Pacific. The 358th completed training in southwest by August 1942. The ground echelon departed Biggs Field, Texas in August 1942, arriving at Fort Dix on 24 August. The air echelon flew through Kellogg Field, Michigan and Dow Field, Maine before ferrying its planes across the Atlantic.

Combat in the European Theater

Due to the haste to move heavy bombers to Europe, the squadron was insufficiently trained for combat and it continued to train in England until it entered combat on 17 November 1942 in a strike against Saint-Nazaire, but returned without striking, having been unable to locate its target.  It attacked Saint-Nazaire the following day, although its intended target was La Pallice. Its initial raids were on airfields, railroads and submarine pens in France.  As a unit of one of only four Flying Fortress groups in VIII Bomber Command during late 1942 and early 1943, the squadron participated in the development of the tactics that would be used throughout the air campaign against Germany.

In 1943, the squadron began flying missions to Germany, participating in the first attack by American heavy bombers on a target in Germany, a raid on the submarine yards at Wilhelmshaven on 27 January 1943.  From that time, it concentrated primarily on strategic bombardment of German industry, marshalling yards, and other strategic targets, including the ball bearing plants at Schweinfurt, shipyards at Bremen and an aircraft engine factory at Hamburg.

On 20 December 1943 one of the squadron's planes, nicknamed the "Jersey Bounce" was hit by flak and lost two engines while attacking the target, causing the Fort to drop behind the formation.  Two 20 millimeter cannon shells exploded in the radio compartment, injuring Technical Sergeant Forrest L. Vosler, the radio operator-gunner.  The first injuring him in the legs and thighs and the second striking is chest and also nearly blinding him.  Sergeant Vosler continued to fire his gun at attacking fighters.  He began to lapse in and out of consciousness, but (working by feel) managed to repair the radio so that emergency transmissions could be made.  When the B-17 ditched, he managed to climb on the wing unaided and assist the badly wounded tail gunner until he could be loaded into one of the plane's dinghies.  Sergeant Vosler was awarded the Medal of Honor for his actions.

The 358th received a Distinguished Unit Citation when adverse weather on 11 January 1944 prevented its fighter cover from joining the group, exposing it to continuous attacks by Luftwaffe fighters.  Despite this opposition, the unit successfully struck an aircraft assembly plant at Oschersleben.

Although a strategic bombing unit, the squadron was diverted on occasion to close air support and interdiction for ground forces.  It attacked gun emplacements and bridges in the Pas-de-Calais during Operation Overlord, the invasion of Normandy, in June 1944; bombed enemy troops during Operation Cobra, the breakout at Saint Lo, and during the Battle of the Bulge.  It bombed military installations near Wesel during Operation Lumberjack, the Allied assault across the Rhine.  Its last combat mission was an attack on 25 April 1945 against an armament factory at Pilsen (now Plzeň).

Following VE Day in May 1945 the 303d Group was reassigned to the North African Division, Air Transport Command and moved to Casablanca Airfield, French Morocco to use its B-17 bombers as transports, ferrying personnel from France to Morocco.  However, the two B-17 groups moved to Casablanca proved surplus to Air Transport Command's needs and the squadron was inactivated in late July 1945 and its planes ferried back to the United States.

Strategic Air Command
Activated in the postwar Strategic Air Command in 1947 at Andrews Field, Maryland, but not equipped and inactivated in September 1948.  Activated again at Davis–Monthan Air Force Base, Arizona in September 1951 and equipped with Boeing B-29 Superfortress bombers.

Reactivated in 1951 as a Boeing B-47 Stratojet medium bomber squadron; aircraft not received until April 1953 when squadron received first production block of B-47Es.   Conducted routine deployments and training during the 1950s and early 1960s.  Inactivated in 1964 with the phaseout of the B-47.

Lineage
 Constituted as the 358th Bombardment Squadron (Heavy) on 28 January 1942
 Activated on 3 February 1942
 Redesignated 358th Bombardment Squadron, Heavy on 20 August 1943
 Inactivated on 25 July 1945
 Redesignated 358th Bombardment Squadron, Very Heavy on 11 June 1947
 Activated on 1 July 1947
 Inactivated on 6 September 1948
 Re-designated 358th Bombardment Squadron, Medium on 27 August 1951
 Activated on 4 September 1951
 Inactivated on 15 June 1964

Assignments
 303d Bombardment Group, 3 February 1942 – 25 July 1945
 303d Bombardment Group, 1 July 1947 – 6 September 1948
 303d Bombardment Group, 4 September 1951
 303d Bombardment Wing, 16 June 1952 – 15 June 1964

Stations
 Pendleton Field, Oregon, 3 February 1942
 Gowen Field, Idaho, 13 March 1942
 Operated from Muroc Army Air Field, California, 28 May – c. 14 June 1942)
 Alamogordo Army Air Field, New Mexico, 18 June 1942
 Biggs Field, Texas, 7–22 August 1942
 RAF Molesworth (AAF-107), England, 12 September 1942
 Casablanca Airfield, French Morocco, c. 31 May – 25 July 1945
 Andrews Field, Maryland, 1 July 1947 – 6 September 1948
 Davis–Monthan Air Force Base, Arizona, 4 September 1951 – 15 June 1964

Aircraft
 Boeing B-17 Flying Fortress, 1942–1945
 Boeing B-29 Superfortress, 1951–1953
 Boeing B-47 Stratojet, 1953–1964

Awards and campaigns

See also

 B-17 Flying Fortress units of the United States Army Air Forces
 List of B-47 units of the United States Air Force

References

Notes
 Explanatory notes

 Citations

Bibliography

 
 
 
 
 

 Further reading
 

Military units and formations established in 1942
Bombardment squadrons of the United States Air Force
Bombardment squadrons of the United States Army Air Forces
Units and formations of Strategic Air Command
World War II strategic bombing units